The sixth season of Smallville, an American television series, began airing on September 28, 2006. The series recounts the early adventures of Kryptonian Clark Kent as he adjusts to life in the fictional town of Smallville, Kansas, during the years before he becomes Superman. The sixth season comprises 22 episodes and concluded its initial airing on May 17, 2007, marking the first season to air on the newly formed The CW television network. Regular cast members during season six include Tom Welling, Kristin Kreuk, Michael Rosenbaum, Erica Durance, Allison Mack, John Glover, and Annette O'Toole.

Season six key story arcs involve Clark (Welling) trying to recapture several escaped criminals from the Phantom Zone, the destinies of Lionel (Glover) and Lex (Rosenbaum) following the aftermath of Lex's possession by Zod and Lionel's adoption as the emissary of Jor-El, and the introductions of DC Comics characters Jimmy Olsen, Oliver Queen and Martian Manhunter, played by Aaron Ashmore, Justin Hartley, and Phil Morris respectively. Other key storylines involve Lana and Lex's marriage, as well as Lex's secret 33.1 projects.

Smallville Season six slipped in the ratings, averaging 4.1 million viewers weekly. It was nominated for an Emmy Award, among other awards, in the category of Outstanding Sound Editing For A Series for the episode "Zod".

Episodes

Tie-ins
In a promotional tie-in with Sprint, Smallville Legends: The Oliver Queen Chronicles was released. The six-episode CGI series chronicled the early life of Oliver Queen. According to Lisa Gregorian, Executive Vice President of worldwide marketing at Warner Bros. Television Group, these promotional tie-ins were ways to get fans more connected to the show. On April 19, 2007, a tie-in with Toyota promoting their new Yaris featured an online comic strip as interstitial programs during new episodes of Smallville, titled Smallville Legends: Justice & Doom. The interactive comic was based on the episode "Justice", which follows the adventures of Oliver Queen, Bart Allen, Victor Stone, and Arthur Curry—the initial members of the "Justice League" in Smallville—as they seek to destroy all of LuthorCorp's secret experimental labs. The online series allowed viewers to investigate alongside the fictional team, in an effort to win prizes. Stephan Nilson wrote all five of the episodes while working with a team of artists on the illustrations. The plot for each comic episode was given to Nilson as the production crew for Smallville was filming their current television episode. Artist Steve Scott drew comic book panels, which were then sent to a group called Motherland. That group reviewed the drawings and told Scott which images to draw on a separate overlay. This allowed for multiple objects to be moved in and out of the same frame.

Awards
The sixth season was awarded Leo Awards in multiple categories. Make-up artist Natalie Cosco was awarded the Leo Award for Best Make-Up for her work on the episodes "Hydro" and "Wither". The show itself won Best Dramatic Series; James Marshall won Best Direction for "Zod"; Caroline Cranston won Best Costume Design for her work on "Arrow", and James Philpott won Best Production Design for "Justice". The American Society of Cinematographers honored the series with an award for the work done on "Arrow", and with an award for Glen Winter for his work on "Noir". Mack won Best Sidekick for the second year in a row when she took home the award in the 2007 Teen Choice Awards. The series was recognized by the Visual Effects Society with a 2007 VES Award nomination for Outstanding Visual Effects in the episode "Zod". The VES recognized the season in 2008, nominating "Justice" for Outstanding Compositing in a Broadcast Program or Commercial. In 2007, the sound effects and foley teams were nominated for a Golden Reel Award for Best Sound Editing for their work on "Zod". David Moxness won the American Society of Cinematographers Outstanding Achievement in Cinematography Award for his work on "Arrow". In the 33rd Annual Saturn Awards, the show was nominated for Best Dramatic Television Series, as well as a Best Supporting Actress nomination for Allison Mack.

Home media release 
The complete sixth season of Smallville was released on September 18, 2007, in North America. Additional releases in region 2 and region 4 took place on October 22, 2007, and March 5, 2008, respectively. This was the first season to be released on Blu-ray Disc. The Blu-ray box set was released in the United States on September 18, 2007, and in Canada on October 9, 2007. Regions 2 and 4 received a release of October 13, 2008 and March 3, 2009, respectively. The box set included various special features, including episode commentary, "Ultimate Fan" featurette, a Green Arrow documentary, as well as mobisodes for the Oliver Queen Chronicles and Justice & Doom.

References

External links

 
 
 List of Smallville season 6 episodes at Wikia
 
 List of Smallville season 6 guide at kryptonsite.com
 Official MySpace profile for Smallville Season 6
 Interview with the WWE's Kane

6
2006 American television seasons
2007 American television seasons